Anomoeotes levis is a species of moth of the Anomoeotidae family. It is known from South Africa.

The larvae have been recorded feeding on Bauhinia and Gardenia species.

References

Endemic moths of South Africa
Anomoeotidae
Moths of Africa
Moths described in 1888